This is a list of Members of Parliament (MPs) elected to the State Great Khural at the 2012 legislative election.

Current composition

Constituency

Party list

References

Legislative election (List of Mps)
Elections in Mongolia
2012 election (List of Mps)